Reykjavik to Rotterdam (2005) was a film and music festival organized by the Reykjavik To Foundation. Films were screened and performances were held in the LantarenVenster theatre, except for Jóhann Jóhannsson's concert, which was held in the Saint Laurens Church. 12 Tónar set up their mobile shop as well.

Performances 
 Jóhann Jóhannsson
 IBM 1401
 Trabant
 Einar Sonic
 Kira Kira
 Mugison
 Kippi Kaninus
 Petur Ben

Movies 
 Ring road
 The Icelandic Dream
 The happy end
 A Man Like Me
 Leap year
 Devil's island
 Rock in Reykjavik
 Last stop
 Full house
 Red buses
 Screaming Masterpiece
 Mugison video clips
 Me and my mum
 Small mall
 Swan
 Death and the children
 The seagulls laughter
 While the cats away
 Cold Fever
 Love is in the air
 Angels of the Universe
 Children of Nature
 The last farm in the valley
 Dark horse
 Regina
 Caramels
 Cold light
 In my life
 Surviving the volcano
 Niceland
 BSI
 Dramarama
 Old spice
 The outlaw
 Lokinhamrar
 Running with the herd
 The Dance
 Count me out
 The lost little caterpillar
 Behind schedule
 Kissing
 Don't worry, be happy!
 Honor of the house
 Hanna from Gjogur
 When the Raven Flies
 The Sea
 101 Reykjavík
 Noi the Albino

External links 
 http://reykjavik.to/rotterdam/2005/start.html

Icelandic culture